Bodie is a ghost town in California.

Bodie may also refer to:

Places 
 Bodie, Washington, a ghost town
 Bodie Hills, a low mountain range in Mono County
 Bodie Island, a barrier peninsula that forms the northernmost portion of the Outer Banks
 Bodie Mine, the patent gold mine which spurred the relocation of Bodie, Washington
 Bodie Mountains, a mountain range in Nevada
 Bodié, a sub-prefecture of Guinea Republic

People 
 Damien Bodie (born 1985), Australian actor
 Ping Bodie (1887–1961), Major League Baseball center fielder
 Troy Bodie (born 1985), Canadian hockey player
 Zvi Bodie, Norman and Adele Barron Professor of Management at Boston University
 Bodie Olmos (born 1975), American actor, son of Edward James Olmos and Kaija Keel
 Bodie Thoene (born 1951), coauthor with Brock Thoene of historical fiction
 Bodie Weldon (1895–1928), professional football player during the 1920s

Fictional characters 
 Bodie Broadus, from the HBO drama The Wire
 Cheyenne Bodie, title character of the American television western series Cheyenne (1955 TV series), played by Clint Walker
 William Bodie, on the British television action series The Professionals

See also
 
 Bode Miller (born 1977), American World Cup alpine ski racer
 Bodhi, a term for enlightenment and sometimes a name
 Bode (disambiguation)
 Bodies (disambiguation)
 Body (disambiguation)
 Brodie, a Scottish surname